Ariel Leishman Maughan (April 26, 1923 – August 4, 1997) was an American professional basketball player.  Born in Salt Lake City, Utah, Maughan attended Utah State University and started his professional career in the Basketball Association of America in 1946, his career lasted five seasons and he played for four teams.  Most of his points came from under the basket, although he received the nickname "Ace" for his shooting ability.  He was also well known for being able to leap high enough to drop in the basketball with his hands above the rim.  Maughan ended his career with 2,046 points in 259 games (7.9 ppg).  Ariel Maughan died on August 4, 1997, at the age of 74.

Ariel Maughan's great great grandfather was Peter Maughan. He was a member of the Church of Jesus Christ of Latter-day Saints. He served in the United States Army during World War II. After his career in basketball he worked as a salesman.

BAA/NBA career statistics

Regular season

Playoffs

References

External links

1923 births
1997 deaths
American men's basketball players
Basketball players from Salt Lake City
Latter Day Saints from Utah
Latter Day Saints from North Carolina
United States Army personnel of World War II
Detroit Falcons (basketball) players
Forwards (basketball)
Providence Steamrollers players
St. Louis Bombers (NBA) players
Utah State Aggies men's basketball players
Washington Capitols players
Wilkes-Barre Barons players